"This Must Be the Place (Naive Melody)" is a song by new wave band Talking Heads. The closing track of its fifth studio album Speaking in Tongues, it was released in November 1983 as the second and final studio single from the album; a live version would be released as a single in 1986. The lyrics were written by frontman David Byrne, and the music was written by Byrne and the other members of the band, Chris Frantz, Tina Weymouth and Jerry Harrison.

Byrne intended the song to be a love song without the clichés of the genre. The parenthesized title refers to the simple ("naïve") construction of the song, which is framed on a sparse ostinato that lasts for the song's duration. This simplicity marked a departure for Talking Heads, which was known for its complex African-inspired polyrhythms and funk.

Background
Speaking in Tongues, Talking Heads' fifth album, was released on June 1, 1983 by Sire Records. It was produced by the band themselves after the group had parted ways with longtime producer Brian Eno.

Composition
In the "Self Interview" on the DVD of the concert film Stop Making Sense, Byrne states that it is a love song, a topic he tends to avoid because it is "kinda big." He also said of the song:

According to the Stop Making Sense commentary track, the title "Naive Melody" refers to the music. On the recording, the guitar and bass each repeat an ostinato for the entire song. According to David Byrne, many professional musicians would not play a song written in that fashion, and that is what makes the melody naive. Byrne played the lead keyboard solo.

Bassist Tina Weymouth stated in the liner notes of Once in a Lifetime: The Best of Talking Heads that the song was created through "truly naive" experimentation with different instruments and jamming. Weymouth played guitar, guitarist Jerry Harrison played a Prophet synthesiser (including the bassline) Wally Badarou used the same synthesizer to add the stabs, and Byrne switched between guitar and another Prophet synthesizer, the latter of which he played using the pitch modulation wheel and "campy" piano glissandos.

Pitchfork later described the song as "an aberration for the Talking Heads. It was more of an exercise in understated musical hypnosis than polyrhythmic, Kuti-quoting funk, well-compressed instead of bursting at the seams, and (in its abashed way) it was a full-blown love song. [..] With "This Must Be the Place", the band simplified their sound dramatically, condensing their sonic palette to the level of small EKG blips (having switched instruments for a lark, this was nearly all they were able to reliably deliver chops-wise) and wringing out only a few chords."

Personnel

 David Byrne – vocals, lead guitar, synthesizer
 Tina Weymouth – rhythm guitar
 Jerry Harrison – synth bass
 Chris Frantz – drums
 Wally Badarou – synthesizer
 David Van Tieghem – percussion

Stop Making Sense
The song is featured in Stop Making Sense (1984), a concert film featuring Talking Heads and directed by Jonathan Demme. Throughout the Stop Making Sense version, Byrne and his bandmates perform by a standard lamp, while close-up images of various body parts are projected onto a screen behind them. As revealed on the commentary to the film, the body parts belong to Byrne and his girlfriend (later wife) Adelle Lutz who was also known as Bonnie. When the song reaches a bridge, the musicians step back and Byrne dances with the lamp, a reference to Fred Astaire's similar dance with a coat-rack in the film Royal Wedding. During the song, Weymouth is seen playing a rare Fender Swinger electric guitar, instead of her usual bass.

The Stop Making Sense version was released as a single in 1986, peaking at #100 on the UK Singles Chart.

Critical reception
In 2014, Pitchfork ranked the song at number 22 in their list of "The 200 Best Songs of the 1980s," with Winston Cook-Wilson of the website saying: "In the process of stripping down, Talking Heads showcased something at the root of their art: David Byrne’s inimitable gift for melody, and his unique ability to make every musical figure seem both familiar and tied directly to the lyrical thought (see 'I feel numb...born with a weak heart/ I guess I must be having fun'). Is there a better moment of catharsis in a pop then the song's final eureka realization, after Byrne gets whacked with the monolithic spiritual hammer and awakes from a life-encompassing daze into unexpected stability? There’s nothing to narrow his eyes at anymore: 'Cover up the blank spots, hit me on the head/ Aaoooh, aaooh, aaooh, aaoooh.' For a band rarely given to addressing issues of the heart head-on, 'Naive Melody' remains an unexpected and peerless achievement." In 2021, it was listed at No. 123 on Rolling Stone's "Top 500 Greatest Songs of All Time".

Music video
The official music video for This Must Be the Place depicts the extended band, for the 1983-84 time period including the Stop Making Sense film, watching light-hearted home movies, before going down into the basement to play their instruments.

The extra band members in this video are:  
 Alex Weir – guitar, vocals (1983–1984) and on horseback in the home movie within this video
 Bernie Worrell – keyboards, backing vocals (1980–1984, 2002) the Native American chief
 Steve Scales – percussion, backing vocals (1980–1984, 2002) the gentleman with the car
 Ednah Holt – vocals (1983–1984) the houseboat lady
 Lynn Mabry – vocals (1983–1984) the log cabin lady in the music video's home movie.

Charts

Original version

Live version

Certifications

In other media
The song inspired the title of the 2011 drama film This Must Be the Place, directed by Paolo Sorrentino with Sean Penn as an aging rock star. In one scene, the main character attends a concert in which David Byrne performs the song in full.
The song is featured twice in the Oscar-winning 1987 film Wall Street, including in the end credits. The song is featured again during the end credits of the sequel Wall Street: Money Never Sleeps.

Covers
The song was covered live by the Montreal-based band Arcade Fire, and is featured as the B-side to their single "Neighborhood #3 (Power Out)". Their version features David Byrne on guest vocals.
The Panics covered the song on their album Rain on the Humming Wire.

Notes

References

Further reading

Talking Heads songs
1983 singles
1983 songs
1986 singles
Live singles
Sire Records singles
Song recordings produced by David Byrne
Song recordings produced by Jerry Harrison
Songs written by Chris Frantz
Songs written by David Byrne
Songs written by Jerry Harrison
Songs written by Tina Weymouth